Bellocco is an Italian surname. Notable people with the surname include:

 Giuseppe Bellocco (born 1948), Italian gangster of the Bellocco 'ndrina
 Gregorio Bellocco (born 1956), Italian gangster of the Bellocco 'ndrina
 Umberto Bellocco (born 1937), Italian gangster of the Bellocco 'ndrina

See also 
 

Italian-language surnames